Monsignor John P. Boland was a Roman Catholic priest in Buffalo, New York involved in unionization and other social justice issues. He was involved in the foundation of the Buffalo Committee on Stabilization of Unemployment, and later became chairman of the New York State Labor Relations Board. After World War II, he was involved with the War Relief Service of the National Catholic Welfare Conference.

References

Sources
 Notre Dame Archives

See also

Catholic social teaching
Year of birth missing
1968 deaths
American Roman Catholic priests
Roman Catholic activists
Roman Catholic Diocese of Buffalo
St. Bonaventure University alumni
History of labor relations in the United States
Religious leaders from New York (state)